The term "present age" is a concept in the philosophy of Søren Kierkegaard. A formulation of the modern age can be found in Kierkegaard's work Two Ages: A Literary Review:

Overview
Kierkegaard argues the present age drains the meaning out of ethical concepts through passionless indolence. The concepts are still used, but are drained of all meaning by virtue of their detachment from a life view which is passion-generated and produces consistent action.

Kierkegaard published this book in 1846 just after the Corsair Affair in which he was attacked by the press. He attacks not only the Press but the Public it serves in this book. He is against abstract moments in time or public opinion as a basis for forming relationships. He wrote about the single individual in his Eighteen Upbuilding Discourses and kept to that category here.

Newspapers were mediating information and individuals were joining based on this mediating influence. Kierkegaard advised that "real" people retain a concrete identity in the face of an abstract public opinion. He wrote:

Interpretations
The Present Age and Two Minor Ethico-Religious Treatises were originally translated by Walter Lowrie and Alexander Dru in 1940. Later, in 1962, Alexander Dru's translation of The Present Age was published along with Of The Difference Between a Genius and an Apostle. This translation had a long introduction by Walter Kaufmann.

Several contemporary philosophers, including Anthony Rudd, John Davenport, and Alasdair MacIntyre allocate this concept and apply it as an analysis of nihilism. Hubert Dreyfus, for example in his essay "Anonymity vrs. Commitment in the Present Age", argues that Kierkegaard, "who was always concerned with nihilism, warns that his age is characterized by a disinterested reflection and curiosity that levels all differences of status and value."

Other thinkers apply the concept as a symptom of herd behavior or mob mentality. Norman Lillegard argues that the present age is "incapable of anything but 'crowd actions' which are not true actions at all."

See also
 Leveling

References

External links
 Søren Kierkegaard, The Present Age, 1846, quotes from The History Guide (translations modified from Alexander Dru's translation (New York: Harper Torchbooks, 1962 [1940]))
 Gregory B. Sadler, Existentialism: Soren Kierkegaard, "The Present Age", June 5, 2012. YouTube.
 Storm's Commentary on The Present Age



Søren Kierkegaard
Ethics
Social philosophy
Political philosophy